Nacimiento (Spanish for "Birth") is an unincorporated community in Monterey County, California.

The name, applied by the railroad in 1905, is from the Nacimiento River.

Climate
This region experiences warm (but not hot) and dry summers, with no average monthly temperatures above 71.6 °F.  According to the Köppen Climate Classification system, Nacimiento has a warm-summer Mediterranean climate, abbreviated "Csb" on climate maps.

References

Unincorporated communities in California
Unincorporated communities in Monterey County, California